In 2015, the UK Government rolled out the degree apprenticeship programme which was developed as part of the higher apprenticeship standard. The programme is the equivalent of a master's or bachelor's degree which offers a level 6 – 7 qualification. Training for this qualification includes working in a full-time job as well as studying at a partner University or training provider.

Requirements 
Degree apprenticeships have been designed for learners 18 years of age or older.

Candidates interested in this programme must already have a level-3 qualification such as an advanced apprenticeship, A levels or an International Baccalaureate. However, some programmes may require further training.

See also 
 Professional Science Master's Degree

References 

Apprenticeship
Vocational education in the United Kingdom